Bhubaneswar Stock Exchange (BhSE) is a defunct stock exchange located in Bhubaneswar, Odisha, India. It was incorporated on 17 April 1989, and granted recognition to the Stock Exchange on 5 June 1989, by the Ministry of Finance, Govt. of India. It is one among the 21 odd regional stock exchanges in India.

By 1999–2000, the exchange had a total of 234 brokers, out of which 15 were corporate brokers. Among 234 brokers, it was further classified as 209 proprietor and 15 corporate broker. Then, there was only 17 sub-brokers registered. The trading membership strength of Bhubaneswar Stock Exchange is 196 at present against the sanctioned strength of 350.

On 15 September 2005, SEBI approved the corporatisation and demutualisation schemes of the Bhubaneshwar Stock Exchange which were required in accordance with the provisions of the Securities Contracts (Regulation) Act, 1956.

See also 
 List of South Asian stock exchanges
 List of stock exchanges in the Commonwealth of Nations

References

Economy of Bhubaneswar
Companies based in Bhubaneswar
Former stock exchanges in India
1989 establishments in Orissa